A papal conclave was held between 22 September and 28 October 1362 in the Palais des Papes of Avignon to elect the successor of Pope Innocent VI. Guillaume de Grimoard was elected pope and took the name Urban V.

Balloting
Twenty cardinals entered the conclave on 22 September, divided roughly into the factions of the French and Gascon cardinals (the latter being subjects of the king of England, in his capacity as duke of Aquitaine). Eleven or twelve of the twenty cardinals were Limousin, including three cardinal-nephews of Innocent VI and six nephews of Pope Clement VI.

After six days, the cardinals agreed upon the election of Hugues Roger, a cardinal and nephew of Clement VI, who refused the election in no uncertain terms (unlike many popes who made a show of "refusing" only to accept soon afterwards). Thereafter, cardinal Raymond di Canillac emerged as papabile but was unable to receive the requisite supermajority.

It became clear that none among the cardinals could receive a two-thirds majority, and thus discussion shifted to names outside the College. Disagreements continued until October 28, when the cardinals agreed on Abbot Guillaume de Grimoard, the apostolic legate to the Kingdom of Naples, at the time residing in Florence. Fearing that Italians wishing to return the papacy to Rome would detain Grimoard, the French cardinals summoned him to Avignon, stating that they wished to consult with him, rather than informing him of his election. It took five weeks for Grimoard to reach Avignon, where he was crowned as Urban V.

Five years after his election, Urban V finally bowed to intense pressure from every direction, and did temporarily return the papacy to Rome on October 16, 1367. He returned to Avignon three years later, however, on August 26, 1370.  He died in December of that year.

List of participants

Twenty out of twenty one cardinals participated in the conclave:

 Élie de Talleyrand-Périgord (created on 25 May 1331) – Cardinal-Bishop of Albano; Dean of the Sacred College of Cardinals
 Guy de Boulogne (20 September 1342) – Cardinal-Bishop of Porto e Santa Rufina; commendatario of S. Cecilia and S. Crisogono; Subdean of the Sacred College of Cardinals
 Nicola Capocci (17 December 1350) – Cardinal-Bishop of Frascati; archpriest of the Liberian Basilica
 Andouin Aubert (15 February 1353) – Cardinal-Bishop of Ostia e Velletri
 Raymond de Canillac, C.R.S.A. (17 December 1350) – Cardinal-Bishop of Palestrina
 , O.S.B. (20 September 1342) – Cardinal-Priest of S. Lorenzo in Damaso; Protopriest and Camerlengo of the Sacred College of Cardinals
 Guillaume d'Aigrefeuille, O.S.B. (17 December 1350) – Cardinal-Priest of S. Maria in Trastevere
 Élie de Saint-Irier, O.S.B. (23 December 1356) – Cardinal-Priest of S. Stefano al Monte Celio
 Pierre de Monteruc (23 December 1356) – Cardinal-Priest of S. Anastasia; Vice-Chancellor of the Holy Roman Church
 Pierre Itier (17 September 1361) – Cardinal-Priest of SS. IV Coronati
 Jean de Blauzac (17 September 1361) – Cardinal-Priest of S. Marco
 Gilles Aycelin de Montaigu (17 September 1361) – Cardinal-Priest of SS. Silvestro e Martino
 Androin de la Roche (17 September 1361) – Cardinal-Priest of S. Marcello
 Guillaume de la Jugie (20 September 1342) – Cardinal-Deacon of S. Maria in Cosmedin; Protodeacon
 Nicolas de Besse (27 February 1344) – Cardinal-Deacon of S. Maria in Via Lata
 Pierre Roger de Beaufort (28 May 1348) – Cardinal-Deacon of S. Maria Nuova; archpriest of the Lateran Basilica
 Rinaldo Orsini (17 December 1350) – Cardinal-Deacon of S. Adriano
 Etienne Aubert (17 September 1361) – Cardinal-Deacon of S. Maria in Aquiro
 Guillaume Bragose (17 September 1361) – Cardinal-Deacon of S. Giorgio in Velabro; Grand Penitentiary
 Hugues de Saint-Martial (17 September 1361) – Cardinal-Deacon of S. Maria in Portico

One cardinal was absent in Italy:

 Gil Álvarez de Albornoz (17 December 1350) – Cardinal-Bishop of  Sabina; Vicar General of the Papal States

Notes

References
Baumgartner, Frederic J. 2003. Behind Locked Doors: A History of the Papal Elections. Palgrave Macmillan. .

Darras, Joseph Épiphane, Spalding, Martin John, and White, Charles Ignatius. 1869. A general history of the Catholic Church.
Emerton, Ephraim. 1917. The beginnings of modern Europe (1250-1450).

Trollope, Thomas Adolphus. 1876. The papal conclaves, as they were and as they are. Chapman and Hall.

1362
14th-century elections
1362
Avignon Papacy